Reluctant Heroes is a 1951 British comedy filmed in Technicolor. It is based on the farce by Colin Morris. Directed by Jack Raymond, it stars Ronald Shiner as Sergeant Bell. It was produced by Henry Halsted and Byron Film. The play, which had premiered at the Whitehall Theatre the previous year, was the first of the Brian Rix company's Whitehall farces.

Plot summary
This comedy is set in an army boot camp. It displays a drill sergeant who must somehow turn an inept group of recruits into real soldiers.

Cast
Sergeant Bell - 	Ronald Shiner
Michael Tone - 	Derek Farr
Gloria Dennis - 	Christine Norden
Horace Gregory - 	Brian Rix
Trooper Morgan - 	Larry Noble
Pat Thompson -          Betty Empey
Penny Roberts -        Angela Wheatland
Sgt. McKenzie -        Anthony Baird
Capt. Percy - 	Colin Morris
Lt. Virginia - Elspet Gray

Reception

Box office
The film is listed in the 12 most popular films at the British box-office in 1952, in an article in the Sydney Sunday Herald that cited Ronald Shiner as the UK's favourite film star of the year.

Brian Rix asserts in his autobiography that it was the UK's top box office film of the year.

References

External links
 
 
 

1951 films
1951 comedy films
British comedy films
1950s English-language films
Films directed by Jack Raymond
British films based on plays
Military humor in film
1950s British films